John Quimby (February 12, 1935 – December 23, 2012) was an American politician.

Born in Prescott, Arizona, Quimby served on the San Bernardino, California city council. He served as a Democrat in the California State Assembly for the 72nd district from 1963 to 1974. He also lobbied for San Bernardino, California and Riverside, California.

Biography
At the age of 12, he was diagnosed with polio after which he used a wheelchair or steel braces. Quimby was the youngest person to serve on the San Bernardino City Council at the age of 22 and was also the first paraplegic to serve in the California Legislature.

Death
Quimby died at the age of 77 on December 23, 2012, of complications from pneumonia.

References

1935 births
2012 deaths
California city council members
Democratic Party members of the California State Assembly
20th-century American politicians